The Visual 50 is a terminal created by Visual Technology, Inc., which was located in Tewksbury, Massachusetts. Visual's slogan was "See for yourself".  It merged with White Pine Software in 1993, which became CU-SeeMe Networks, in turn absorbed into RadVision in 2001.

The terminal consists of a monitor which is the main component and a keyboard.  It was used as a computer terminal so there are no internal drives or daughter cards.  The primary component in the case is a motherboard with a modem port, keyboard port, and an aux. port.  Termcap provides support for the Visual 50 by way of the entries named v50, vi50, v50am, or visual50, depending on the system.  The terminal uses on an SGS (now STMicroelectronics) Z8400AB1 CPU, based on the Zilog Z80A CPU.  This CPU has an 8 bit data bus and a 16 bit address bus, and runs at 4 MHz.  The keyboard is a Keytronic A65-0248, attached by a 4 wire telephone cord.  The keyboard uses an Intel P8048H MCU, a common MCU for keyboards.

See also
CU-SeeMe

External links
Termcap source file 
IRIX Admin Manual; Peripheral Devices; Chapter 1. Terminals and Modems
Visual Technology Visual 1050

Character-oriented terminal